Olusola Awosina (born 2 October 1970) is a Nigerian weightlifter. He competed in the men's middle heavyweight event at the 1988 Summer Olympics.

References

External links
 

1970 births
Living people
Nigerian male weightlifters
Olympic weightlifters of Nigeria
Weightlifters at the 1988 Summer Olympics
Place of birth missing (living people)
20th-century Nigerian people
21st-century Nigerian people